Rebecca Frank Dallet (born July 15, 1969) is an American lawyer and a justice of the Wisconsin Supreme Court.  Prior to her 2018 election, she served ten years as a Wisconsin Circuit Court Judge in Milwaukee County. Earlier in her career she worked as a prosecutor and appointed court official.

Early life and career
Dallet grew up in Ohio and graduated from Shaker Heights High School. She received a B.A. degree in Economics from Ohio State University, and a J.D. degree from the Case Western Reserve University School of Law. After law school, Dallet served as a Law Clerk for a U.S. Magistrate Judge. Dallet worked as an Assistant United States Attorney, assistant district attorney with the Milwaukee County District Attorney's Office and as an adjunct professor of law at Marquette University Law School. Dallet was elected as a Judge for the Milwaukee County Circuit Court in 2008, then re-elected in 2014. Prior to her election, Dallet served as President of the Milwaukee Trial Judges Association and Secretary of the Association of Women Lawyers. Dallet previously served one year as the first female presiding court commissioner in Milwaukee County history.

Wisconsin Supreme Court (2018–present)
Dallet's election to the Supreme Court was the subject of national media coverage. Dallet was endorsed by now-President Joe Biden, former United States Attorney General Eric Holder, as well as U.S. Senators Cory Booker and Tammy Baldwin. Dallet was also supported by Former Governor of Wisconsin Jim Doyle, former U.S. Senator Herb Kohl, Wisconsin Supreme Court Justices Shirley Abrahamson and Ann Walsh Bradley, and over 200 state circuit court judges. Dallet spoke at the Wisconsin Women's March in January 2018. Dallet defeated Sauk County Judge Michael Screnock for the seat by a margin of 56% to 44%. Her term began on August 1, 2018.

Personal life
Dallet resides in Whitefish Bay, Wisconsin, with her husband and three children.

Electoral history

Wisconsin Circuit Court (2008, 2014)

| colspan="6" style="text-align:center;background-color: #e9e9e9;"| General Election, April 1, 2008

| colspan="6" style="text-align:center;background-color: #e9e9e9;"| General Election, April 24, 2014

Wisconsin Supreme Court (2018)

| colspan="6" style="text-align:center;background-color: #e9e9e9;"| Primary Election, February 20, 2018

| colspan="6" style="text-align:center;background-color: #e9e9e9;"| General Election, April 3, 2018

References

External links
 Dallet for Justice Campaign Website
 Wisconsin Supreme Court

1969 births
Living people
People from Whitefish Bay, Wisconsin
Ohio State University College of Arts and Sciences alumni
Wisconsin lawyers
Wisconsin state court judges
Justices of the Wisconsin Supreme Court
21st-century American judges
Case Western Reserve University School of Law alumni
Marquette University faculty
Assistant United States Attorneys
21st-century American women judges
People from Shaker Heights, Ohio
American women academics